This is a list of notable University of New South Wales staff.

Staff

Computer scientists

Historians

Legal academics
Ronald Sackville

Mathematicians

Medical doctors

Philosophers

Psychologists
John Sweller

Others

Administration

Chancellors

Vice Chancellors

UNSW Canberra
UNSW Canberra is a campus of the UNSW and is located at the Australian Defence Force Academy. Since 1967 the university has been providing tertiary education to officers in the Australian Defence Force through the Royal Military College, Duntroon. In 1986 the Australian Defence Force Academy, a tri-service military training institution, was established. The academy is run jointly by the commandant, who represents the Australian Defence Force side, and the rector, who represents the UNSW.

Deans and rectors

Past and present rectors

Notes

References

University of New South Wales

New South Wales
University